Witchcraft traditionally means the use of magic or supernatural powers to harm others. A practitioner is a witch. In medieval and early modern Europe, where the term originated, accused witches were usually women who were believed to have used malevolent magic against their own community, and often to have communed with evil beings. It was thought witchcraft could be thwarted by protective magic or counter-magic, which could be provided by cunning folk or folk healers. Suspected witches were also intimidated, banished, attacked or killed. Often they would be formally prosecuted and punished, if found guilty or simply believed to be guilty. European witch-hunts and witch trials in the early modern period led to tens of thousands of executions. In some regions, many of those accused of witchcraft were folk healers or midwives. European belief in witchcraft gradually dwindled during and after the Age of Enlightenment.

Contemporary cultures that believe in magic and the supernatural often believe in witchcraft. Anthropologists have applied the term "witchcraft" to similar beliefs and occult practices described by many non-European cultures, and cultures that have adopted the English language will often call these practices "witchcraft", as well. As with the cunning-folk in Europe, Indigenous communities that believe in the existence of witchcraft define witches as the opposite of their healers and medicine people, who are sought out for protection against witchcraft. Modern witch-hunting takes place in parts of Africa and Asia.

A theory that witchcraft was a survival of a European pagan religion (the witch-cult hypothesis) gained popularity in the early 20th century, but has been discredited. A newer theory is that the idea of "witchcraft" developed to explain strange misfortune, similar to ideas such as the evil eye.

In contemporary Western culture, most notably since the growth of Wicca from the 1950s, some modern pagans and followers of New Age belief systems may self-identify as "witches", and use the term "witchcraft" for their self-help, healing or divination rituals. Others avoid the term due to its negative connotations.

Concept

The concept of witchcraft and the belief in its existence have persisted throughout recorded history. It has been found at various times and in many forms among cultures worldwide, and continues to have an important role in some cultures today. Most societies have believed in, and feared, an ability by some individuals to cause supernatural harm and misfortune to others. This may come from mankind's tendency "to want to assign occurrences of remarkable good or bad luck to agency, either human or superhuman". Historians and anthropologists see the concept of "witchcraft" as one of the ways humans have tried to explain strange misfortune. Some cultures have feared witchcraft much less than others, because they tend to have other explanations for strange misfortune; for example that it was caused by gods, spirits, demons or fairies, or by other humans who have unwittingly cast the 'evil eye'. For example, the Gaels of Ireland and the Scottish Highlands historically held a strong belief in fairy folk, who could cause supernatural harm, and witch-hunting was very rare in these regions compared to other regions of the British Isles.

Ronald Hutton outlined five key characteristics ascribed to witches and witchcraft by most cultures that believe in the concept. Traditionally, witchcraft was believed to be the use of magic to cause harm or misfortune to others; it was used by the witch against their own community; it was seen as immoral and often thought to involve communion with evil beings; powers of witchcraft were believed to have been acquired through inheritance or initiation; and witchcraft could be thwarted by defensive magic, persuasion, intimidation or physical punishment of the alleged witch.

Historically, the predominant concept of witchcraft in the Western world derives from Old Testament laws against witchcraft, and entered the mainstream when belief in witchcraft gained Church approval in the Early Modern Period. It is a theosophical conflict between good and evil, where witchcraft was generally evil and often associated with the Devil and Devil worship. This culminated in deaths, torture and scapegoating (casting blame for misfortune), and many years of large scale witch-trials and witch hunts, especially in Protestant Europe, before largely ceasing during the European Age of Enlightenment. Christian views in the modern day are diverse and cover the gamut of views from intense belief and opposition (especially by Christian fundamentalists) to non-belief, and even approval in some churches. From the mid-20th century, witchcraft—sometimes called contemporary witchcraft to clearly distinguish it from older beliefs—became the name of a branch of modern paganism. It is most notably practiced in the Wiccan and modern witchcraft traditions, and it is no longer practiced in secrecy.

The Western mainstream Christian view is far from the only societal perspective about witchcraft. Many cultures worldwide continue to have widespread practices and cultural beliefs that are loosely translated into English as "witchcraft", although the English translation masks a very great diversity in their forms, magical beliefs, practices, and place in their societies. During the Age of Colonialism, many cultures across the globe were exposed to the modern Western world via colonialism, usually accompanied and often preceded by intensive Christian missionary activity (see "Christianization"). In these cultures beliefs that were related to witchcraft and magic were influenced by the prevailing Western concepts of the time. Witch-hunts, scapegoating, and the killing or shunning of suspected witches still occur in the modern era.

Suspicion of modern medicine due to beliefs about illness being due to witchcraft also continues in many countries to this day, with serious healthcare consequences. HIV/AIDS and Ebola virus disease are two examples of often-lethal infectious disease epidemics whose medical care and containment has been severely hampered by regional beliefs in witchcraft. Other severe medical conditions whose treatment is hampered in this way include tuberculosis, leprosy, epilepsy and the common severe bacterial Buruli ulcer.

Etymology 

According to the Oxford English Dictionary, wicce and wicca were probably derived from the Old English verb , meaning 'to practice witchcraft'. Wiccian has a cognate in Middle Low German  (attested from the 13th century).  The further etymology of this word is problematic. It has no clear cognates in other Germanic languages outside of English and Low German, and there are numerous possibilities for the Indo-European root from which it may have derived.

In most other Germanic languages, their word for 'witch' comes from the same root as these; for example German Hexe and Dutch heks.

In colloquial modern English, the word witch is generally used for women. A male practitioner of magic or witchcraft is more commonly called a 'wizard', or sometimes, 'warlock'. When the word witch is used to refer to a member of a neo-pagan tradition or religion (such as Wicca), it can refer to a person of any gender.

Practices 

Where belief in malicious magic practices exists, practitioners are typically forbidden by law as well as hated and feared by the general populace, while beneficial magic is tolerated or even accepted wholesale by the people—even if the orthodox establishment opposes it.

In some definitions, witches differ from sorceresses in that they do not need to use tools or actions to curse; their maleficium is believed to flow from some intangible inner quality, may be unaware of being a witch, or may have been convinced of their nature by the suggestion of others. This definition was pioneered in 1937 in a study of central African magical beliefs by E. E. Evans-Pritchard, who cautioned that it might not match English usage. Historians have found this definition difficult to apply to European witchcraft, where witches were believed to use physical techniques, as well as some who were believed to cause harm by thought alone.

Spell casting 

Probably the best-known characteristic of a witch is her ability to cast a spell—a set of words, a formula or verse, a ritual, or a combination of these, employed to do magic. Spells traditionally were cast by many methods, such as by the inscription of runes or sigils on an object to give that object magical powers; by the immolation or binding of a wax or clay image (poppet) of a person to affect them magically; by the recitation of incantations; by the performance of physical rituals; by the employment of magical herbs as amulets or potions; by gazing at mirrors, swords or other specula (scrying) for purposes of divination; and by many other means.

Necromancy (conjuring the dead) 
Strictly speaking, necromancy is the practice of conjuring the spirits of the dead for divination or prophecy, although the term has also been applied to raising the dead for other purposes. The biblical Witch of Endor performed it (1 Samuel 28th chapter), and it is among the witchcraft practices condemned by Ælfric of Eynsham: "Witches still go to cross-roads and to heathen burials with their delusive magic and call to the devil; and he comes to them in the likeness of the man that is buried there, as if he arises from death."

Witchcraft and cunning-craft 

Traditionally, the terms "witch" and "witchcraft" had negative connotations. Most societies that have believed in harmful witchcraft or 'black' magic have also believed in helpful or 'white' magic.  In these societies, practitioners of helpful magic provided services such as breaking the effects of witchcraft, healing, divination, finding lost or stolen goods, and love magic. In Britain they were commonly known as cunning folk or wise people. Alan McFarlane writes, "There were a number of interchangeable terms for these practitioners, 'white', 'good', or 'unbinding' witches, blessers, wizards, sorcerers, however 'cunning-man' and 'wise-man' were the most frequent". Ronald Hutton prefers the term "service magicians". Often these people were involved in identifying alleged witches.

Hostile churchmen sometimes branded any magic-workers "witches" as a way of smearing them. Englishman Reginald Scot, who sought to disprove witchcraft and magic, wrote in The Discoverie of Witchcraft (1584), "At this day it is indifferent to say in the English tongue, 'she is a witch' or 'she is a wise woman. Folk magicians throughout Europe were often viewed ambivalently by communities, and were considered as capable of harming as of healing, which could lead to their being accused as "witches" in the negative sense. Many English "witches" convicted of consorting with demons may have been cunning folk whose supposed fairy familiars had been demonised; many French  ("diviner-healers") were accused of witchcraft, over half the accused witches in Hungary seem to have been healers, and the "vast majority" of Finland's accused witches were folk healers. Hutton, however, says that "Service magicians were sometimes denounced as witches, but seem to have made up a minority of the accused in any area studied".

Thwarting witchcraft

Societies that believed in witchcraft also believed that it could be thwarted in various ways. One common way was to use protective magic or counter-magic, of which the cunning folk were experts. This included charms, talismans and amulets, anti-witch marks, witch bottles, witch balls, and burying objects such as horse skulls inside the walls of buildings. Another believed cure for bewitchment was to persuade or force the alleged witch to lift their spell. Often, people would attempt to thwart the witchcraft by physically punishing the alleged witch, such as by banishing, wounding, torturing or killing them. "In most societies, however, a formal and legal remedy was preferred to this sort of private action", whereby the alleged witch would be prosecuted and then formally punished if found guilty. This often resulted in execution.

Accusations of witchcraft 

Éva Pócs writes that reasons for accusations of witchcraft fall into four general categories:
 A person was caught in the act of positive or negative sorcery
 A well-meaning sorcerer or healer lost their clients' or the authorities' trust
 A person did nothing more than gain the enmity of their neighbors
 A person was reputed to be a witch and surrounded with an aura of witch-beliefs or Occultism

She identifies three kinds of witch in popular belief:
 The "neighborhood witch" or "social witch": a witch who curses a neighbor following some dispute.
 The "magical" or "sorcerer" witch: either a professional healer, sorcerer, seer or midwife, or a person who has through magic increased her fortune to the perceived detriment of a neighboring household; due to neighborhood or community rivalries, and the ambiguity between positive and negative magic, such individuals can become branded as witches.
 The "supernatural" or "night" witch: portrayed in court narratives as a demon appearing in visions and dreams.
"Neighborhood witches" are the product of neighborhood tensions, and are found only in village communities where the inhabitants largely rely on each other. Such accusations follow the breaking of some social norm, such as the failure to return a borrowed item, and any person part of the normal social exchange could potentially fall under suspicion. Claims of "sorcerer" witches and "supernatural" witches could arise out of social tensions, but not exclusively; the supernatural witch often had nothing to do with communal conflict, but expressed tensions between the human and supernatural worlds; and in Eastern and Southeastern Europe such supernatural witches became an ideology explaining calamities that befell whole communities.

The historian Norman Gevitz has written:

European witch-hunts and witch-trials

In Christianity, sorcery came to be associated with heresy and apostasy and to be viewed as evil. Among the Catholics, Protestants, and secular leadership of the European Late Medieval/Early Modern period, fears about witchcraft rose to fever pitch and sometimes led to large-scale witch-hunts. The key century was the fifteenth, which saw a dramatic rise in awareness and terror of witchcraft, culminating in the publication of the  but prepared by such fanatical popular preachers as Bernardino of Siena. In total, tens or hundreds of thousands of people were executed, and others were imprisoned, tortured, banished, and had lands and possessions confiscated. The majority of those accused were women, though in some regions the majority were men. In early modern Scots, the word warlock came to be used as the male equivalent of witch (which can be male or female, but is used predominantly for females).

The Malleus Maleficarum, (Latin for 'Hammer of The Witches') was a witch-hunting manual written in 1486 by two German monks, Heinrich Kramer and Jacob Sprenger. It was used by both Catholics and Protestants for several hundred years, outlining how to identify a witch, what makes a woman more likely than a man to be a witch, how to put a witch on trial, and how to punish a witch. The book defines a witch as evil and typically female. The book became the handbook for secular courts throughout Renaissance Europe, but was not used by the Inquisition, which even cautioned against relying on The Work. It is likely that this caused witch mania to become so widespread. It was the most sold book in Europe for over 100 years, after the Bible.

European witch-trials reached their peak in the early 17th century, after which popular sentiment began to turn against the practice. Friedrich Spee's book Cautio Criminalis, published in 1631, argued that witch-trials were largely unreliable and immoral. In 1682, King Louis XIV prohibited further witch-trials in France. In 1736, Great Britain formally ended witch-trials with passage of the Witchcraft Act.

Modern witch-hunts

Belief in witchcraft continues to be present today in some societies and accusations of witchcraft are the trigger for serious forms of violence, including murder. Such incidents are common in countries such as Burkina Faso, Ghana, India, Kenya, Malawi, Nepal and Tanzania. Accusations of witchcraft are sometimes linked to personal disputes, jealousy, and conflicts between neighbors or family members over land or inheritance. Witchcraft-related violence is often discussed as a serious issue in the broader context of violence against women. In Tanzania, about 500 old women are murdered each year following accusations of witchcraft or accusations of being a witch. Apart from extrajudicial violence, state-sanctioned violence also occurs in some jurisdictions. For instance, in Saudi Arabia practicing witchcraft and sorcery is a crime punishable by death and the country has executed people for this crime in 2011, 2012 and 2014.

Children who live in some regions of the world, such as parts of Africa, are also vulnerable to violence that is related to witchcraft accusations. Such incidents have also occurred in immigrant communities in the UK, including the much publicized case of the murder of Victoria Climbié.

Wicca 

During the 20th century, interest in witchcraft rose in English-speaking and European countries. From the 1920s, Margaret Murray popularized the 'witch-cult hypothesis': the idea that those persecuted as 'witches' in early modern Europe were followers of a benevolent pagan religion that had survived the Christianization of Europe. This has been proven untrue by further historical research. 

From the 1930s, occult neopagan groups began to emerge who called their religion a kind of 'witchcraft'. They were initiatory secret societies inspired by Murray's 'witch cult' theory, ceremonial magic, Aleister Crowley's Thelema, and historical paganism.  They do not use the term 'witchcraft' in the traditional way, but instead define their practices as a kind of "positive magic". The earliest group was Gerald Gardner's  'Bricket Wood coven'. Gardner claimed that it was the continuation of a pre-Christian religion, but this is disputed by academics. The 'witchcraft' that Gardner taught, later known as 'Wicca', had a lot in common with Margaret Murray's hypothetical 'witch cult'. Indeed, Murray wrote an introduction to Gardner's Witchcraft Today (1954), in which he outlines some of the beliefs of his group. Another group, founded in the 1960s, was Robert Cochrane's 'Clan of Tubal Cain'.  Other lone practitioners and writers such as Paul Huson claimed to have inherited surviving traditions of 'witchcraft'.

Various forms of Wicca are now practised as a religion with positive ethical principles, organised into autonomous covens and led by a High Priesthood. A survey published in 2000 cited just over 200,000 people who reported practicing Wicca in the United States. There is also an "Eclectic Wiccan" movement of individuals and groups who share key Wiccan beliefs but have no formal link with traditional Wiccan covens. Some Wiccan-inspired neopagans call their beliefs and practices "traditional witchcraft" or the "traditional craft" rather than Wicca. Pagan studies scholar Ethan Doyle White described it as "a broad movement of aligned magico-religious groups who reject any relation to Gardnerianism and the wider Wiccan movement, claiming older, more 'traditional' roots. Although typically united by a shared aesthetic rooted in European folklore, the Traditional Craft contains within its ranks a rich and varied array of occult groups, from those who follow a contemporary Pagan path that is suspiciously similar to Wicca, to those who adhere to Luciferianism". It includes the Feri Tradition, Cochrane's Craft and the Sabbatic Craft. While some Wiccans call themselves 'witches', others avoid the term due to its negative connotations.

An Italian neopagan religion similar to Wicca emerged in the 1970s, known as Stregheria. While Wicca was inspired by Murray's supposed 'witch cult', Stregheria closely resembles Charles Leland's controversial account of an Italian 'pagan witchcraft' religion, which he wrote about in Aradia, or the Gospel of the Witches (1899). Its followers worship the Goddess Diana, her brother Dianus/Lucifer, and their daughter Aradia. They do not see Lucifer as the evil Satan that Christians see, but a benevolent god of the Sun. Most followers celebrate eight festivals equivalent to the Wiccan Wheel of the Year, though others follow the ancient Roman festivals. An emphasis is placed on ancestor worship and balance.

Witchcraft, feminism, and media 
Some of the recent growth in Wicca has been attributed to popular media such as Charmed, Buffy the Vampire Slayer, and the Harry Potter series, with their depictions of "positive witchcraft", which differs from the historical, traditional, and Indigenous definitions. A case study, "Mass Media and Religious Identity: A Case Study of Young Witches", found that the portrayal of 'positive witchcraft' in popular culture is one reason young people are choosing to become Wiccans or self-identify as 'witches'. The Internet is also thought to be driving growth in Wicca.

Wiccans often consider their beliefs to be in line with liberal ideals such as the Green movement, and particularly with feminism, by providing young women with what they see as a means for self-empowerment, control of their own lives, and a way of influencing the world around them. Feminist ideals are prominent in some branches of Wicca, such as Dianic Wicca, which has a tradition of women-led and women-only groups. The 2002 study Enchanted Feminism: The Reclaiming Witches of San Francisco suggests that some branches of Wicca include influential members of the second wave of feminism, which has also been redefined as a religious movement.

Historical and religious perspectives

Near East beliefs
The belief in sorcery and its practice seem to have been widespread in the ancient Near East and Nile Valley. It played a conspicuous role in the cultures of ancient Egypt and in Babylonia. The latter tradition included an Akkadian anti-witchcraft ritual, the Maqlû. A section from the Code of Hammurabi (about 2000 BC) prescribes:

Abrahamic religions
Christianity

Hebrew Bible 

According to the New Advent Catholic Encyclopedia: 

Verses such as Deuteronomy 18:11–12 and Exodus 22:18 ("Thou shalt not suffer a witch to live") thus provided scriptural justification for Christian witch hunters in the early modern period (see Christian views on magic).

The precise meaning of the Hebrew , usually translated as witch or sorceress, is uncertain. His theory still holds some currency, but is not widely accepted, and in Daniel 2:2  is listed alongside other magic practitioners who could interpret dreams: magicians, astrologers, and Chaldeans. The Greek  literally means 'herbalist' or one who uses or administers drugs, but it was used virtually synonymously with mageia and goeteia as a term for a sorcerer.

The Bible provides some evidence that these commandments against sorcery were enforced under the Hebrew kings:

New Testament 

The New Testament condemns the practice as an abomination, just as the Old Testament had. The word in most New Testament translations is sorcerer/sorcery rather than witch/witchcraft.

Judaism 

Jewish law views the practice of witchcraft as being laden with idolatry and/or necromancy; both being serious theological and practical offenses in Judaism. Although Maimonides vigorously denied the efficacy of all methods of witchcraft, and claimed that the Biblical prohibitions regarding it were precisely to wean the Israelites from practices related to idolatry. It is acknowledged that while magic exists, it is forbidden to practice it on the basis that it usually involves the worship of other gods. Rabbis of the Talmud also condemned magic when it produced something other than illusion, giving the example of two men who use magic to pick cucumbers. The one who creates the illusion of picking cucumbers should not be condemned, only the one who actually picks the cucumbers through magic.

However, some of the rabbis practiced "magic" themselves or taught the subject. For instance, Rava (amora) created a golem and sent it to Rav Zeira, and Hanina and Hoshaiah studied every Friday together and created a small calf to eat on Shabbat. In these cases, the "magic" was seen more as divine miracles (i.e., coming from God rather than "unclean" forces) than as witchcraft.

Judaism does make it clear that Jews shall not try to learn about the ways of witches and that witches are to be put to death.

Judaism's most famous reference to a medium is undoubtedly the Witch of Endor whom Saul consults, as recounted in 1 Samuel 28.

Islam 

Divination and magic in Islam encompass a wide range of practices, including black magic, warding off the evil eye, the production of amulets and other magical equipment, evocation, casting lots, and astrology.

Legitimacy of practising witchcraft is disputed. Most of Islamic traditions distinguishes magic between good magic and black magic. al-Razi and Ibn Sina, describe that magic is merely a tool and only the outcome determines whether or not the act of magic was legitimate or not. Al-Ghazali, although admitting the reality of magic, regards learning all sorts of magic as forbidden. Ibn al-Nadim argues that good supernatural powers are received from God after purifying the soul, while sorcerers please devils and commit acts of disobedience and sacrifes to demons. Whether or not sorcery is accessed by acts of piety or disobedience is often seen as an indicator whether magic is licit or illicit. Ibn Qayyim al-Jawziyya, a disciple of Ibn Taimiyya, who became the major source for Wahhabism, disregards magic, including exorcisms, entirely as superstition. Ibn Khaldun brands sorcery, talismans, and prestidigitation  as forbidden and illegal. Tabasi did not subscribe to the rationalized framework of magic of most Ash'arite theologians, but only offered a wide range of rituals to perform sorcery. Yet he agrees that only magic in accordance with sharia is permissible. Most of Islamic traditions distinguishes magic between good magic and black magic. Miracles belong to licit magic and are considered gifts of God.

The reality of magic is confirmed by the Quran. The Quran itself is said to bestow magical blessings upon hearers and heal them, based on al-Isra. Solomon had the power to speak with animals and jinn, and command devils, which is only given to him with God's permission. Surah Al-Falaq is used as a prayer to God to ward off black magic and is, according to hadith-literature, revealed to Muhammad to protect him against Jann the ancestor of the jinn Muhammad was falsely accused of being a magician by his opponents. The idea that devils teach magic is confirmed in Al-Baqara. A pair of fallen angels named Harut and Marut is also mentioned to tempt people into learning sorcery.

Scholars of the history of religion have linked several magical practises in Islam with pre-Islamic Turkish and East African customs. Most notable of these customs is the Zār.

By region

Africa 

Much of what witchcraft represents in Africa has been susceptible to misunderstandings and confusion, thanks in no small part to a tendency among western scholars since the time of the now largely discredited Margaret Murray to approach the subject through a comparative lens vis-a-vis European witchcraft.

While some colonialists tried to eradicate witch hunting by introducing legislation to prohibit accusations of witchcraft, some of the countries where this was the case have formally recognized the reality of witchcraft via the law. This has produced an environment that encourages persecution of suspected witches.

Cameroon 
It encompasses the occult, the transformative, killing and healing.

Central African Republic 
Every year, hundreds of people in the Central African Republic are convicted of witchcraft. Christian militias in the Central African Republic have also kidnapped, burnt and buried alive women accused of being 'witches' in public ceremonies.

Democratic Republic of the Congo 
, between 25,000 and 50,000 children in Kinshasa, Democratic Republic of the Congo, had been accused of witchcraft and thrown out of their homes. These children have been subjected to often-violent abuse during exorcisms, sometimes supervised by self-styled religious pastors. Other pastors and Christian activists strongly oppose such accusations and try to rescue children from their unscrupulous colleagues. In 2002, USAID funded the production of two short films on the subject, made in Kinshasa by journalists Angela Nicoara and Mike Ormsby.

In April 2008, in Kinshasa, the police arrested 14 suspected victims (of penis snatching) and sorcerers accused of using black magic or witchcraft to steal (make disappear) or shrink men's penises to extort cash for cure, amid a wave of panic.

According to one study, the belief in magical warfare technologies (such as "bulletproofing") in the Eastern Democratic Republic of the Congo serves a group-level function, as it increases group efficiency in warfare, even if it is suboptimal at the individual level. The authors of the study argue that this is one reason why the belief in witchcraft persists.

Complimentary remarks about witchcraft by a native Congolese initiate:

Ghana 

In Ghana, women are often accused of witchcraft and attacked by neighbours. Because of this, there exist six witch camps in the country where women suspected of being witches can flee for safety. The witch camps, which exist solely in Ghana, are thought to house a total of around 1000 women. Some of the camps are thought to have been set up over 100 years ago. The Ghanaian government has announced that it intends to close the camps.

Arrests were made in an effort to avoid bloodshed seen in Ghana a decade ago, when 12 alleged penis snatchers were beaten to death by mobs. While it is easy for modern people to dismiss such reports, Uchenna Okeja argues that a belief system in which such magical practices are deemed possible offer many benefits to Africans who hold them. For example, the belief that a sorcerer has "stolen" a man's penis functions as an anxiety-reduction mechanism for men suffering from impotence, while simultaneously providing an explanation that is consistent with African cultural beliefs rather than appealing to Western scientific notions that are tainted by the history of colonialism (at least for many Africans).

Kenya 
It was reported that a mob in Kenya had burnt to death at least 11 people accused of witchcraft in 2008.

Malawi 
In Malawi it is also common practice to accuse children of witchcraft and many children have been abandoned, abused and even killed as a result. As in other African countries both African traditional healers and their Christian counterparts are trying to make a living out of exorcising children and are actively involved in pointing out children as witches. Various secular and Christian organizations are combining their efforts to address this problem.

According to William Kamkwamba, witches and wizards are afraid of money, which they consider a rival evil. Any contact with cash will snap their spell and leave the wizard naked and confused, so placing cash, such as kwacha around a room or bed mat will protect the resident from their malevolent spells.

Nigeria 
In Nigeria, several Pentecostal pastors have mixed their evangelical brand of Christianity with African beliefs in witchcraft to benefit from the lucrative witch finding and exorcism business—which in the past was the exclusive domain of the so-called witch doctor or traditional healers. These pastors have been involved in the torturing and even killing of children accused of witchcraft. Over the past decade, around 15,000 children have been accused, and around 1,000 murdered. Churches are very numerous in Nigeria, and competition for congregations is hard. Some pastors attempt to establish a reputation for spiritual power by "detecting" child witches, usually following a death or loss of a job within a family, or an accusation of financial fraud against the pastor. In the course of "exorcisms", accused children may be starved, beaten, mutilated, set on fire, forced to consume acid or cement, or buried alive. While some church leaders and Christian activists have spoken out strongly against these abuses, many Nigerian churches are involved in the abuse, although church administrations deny knowledge of it.

In May 2020, fifteen adults, mostly women, were set ablaze after being accused of witchcraft, including the mother of the instigator of the attack, Thomas Obi Tawo, a local politician.

Sierra Leone 
Among the Mende (of Sierra Leone), trial and conviction for witchcraft has a beneficial effect for those convicted. "The witchfinder had warned the whole village to ensure the relative prosperity of the accused and sentenced ... old people. ... Six months later all of the people ... accused, were secure, well-fed and arguably happier than at any [previous] time; they had hardly to beckon and people would come with food or whatever was needful. ... Instead of such old and widowed people being left helpless or (as in Western society) institutionalized in old people's homes, these were reintegrated into society and left secure in their old age ... Old people are 'suitable' candidates for this kind of accusation in the sense that they are isolated and vulnerable, and they are 'suitable' candidates for 'social security' for precisely the same reasons." In Kuranko language, the term for witchcraft is  referring to 'extraordinary powers'.

Tanzania 
In Tanzania in 2008, President Kikwete publicly condemned witchdoctors for killing albinos for their body parts, which are thought to bring good luck. 25 albinos have been murdered since March 2007. In Tanzania, albinos are often murdered for their body parts on the advice of witch doctors in order to produce powerful amulets that are believed to protect against witchcraft and make the owner prosper in life.

Zulu 
Native to the Zulu people, witches called  protect people against evil spirits. They usually train for about five to seven years. In the cities, this training could take only several months.

This is a job that is passed on to future generations. In the Zulu population, 80% of people contact s.

Americas

British America and the United States

Massachusetts 

In 1645, Springfield, Massachusetts, experienced America's first accusations of witchcraft when husband and wife Hugh and Mary Parsons accused each other of witchcraft. At America's first witch trial, Hugh was found innocent, while Mary was acquitted of witchcraft but sentenced to be hanged for the death of her child. She died in prison. From 1645 to 1663, about eighty people throughout England's Massachusetts Bay Colony were accused of practicing witchcraft. Thirteen women and two men were executed in a witch-hunt that lasted throughout New England from 1645 to 1663. The Salem witch trials followed in 1692–93. These witch trials were the most famous in British North America and took place in the coastal settlements near Salem, Massachusetts. Prior to the witch trials, nearly 300 men and women had been suspected of partaking in witchcraft, and 19 of these people were hanged, and one was "pressed to death".

Despite being generally known as the Salem witch trials, the preliminary hearings in 1692 were conducted in a variety of towns across the province: Salem Village (now Danvers), Salem Town, Ipswich, and Andover. The best known trials were conducted by the Court of Oyer and Terminer in 1692 in Salem Town.  The Crucible by Arthur Miller is a dramatized and partially fictionalized story of the Salem witch trials that took place in the Massachusetts Bay Colony during 1692–93.

Maryland 
In Maryland, there is a legend of Moll Dyer, who escaped a fire set by fellow colonists only to die of exposure in December 1697. The historical record of Dyer is scant as all official records were burned in a courthouse fire, though the county courthouse has on display the rock where her frozen body was found. A letter from a colonist of the period describes her in most unfavourable terms. A local road is named after Dyer, where her homestead was said to have been. Many local families have their own version of the Moll Dyer affair, and her name is spoken with care in the rural southern counties.

Pennsylvania 
Margaret Mattson and another woman were tried in 1683 on accusations of witchcraft in the Province of Pennsylvania.  They were acquitted by William Penn after a trial in Philadelphia. These are the only known trials for witchcraft in Pennsylvania history. 

Some of Margaret's neighbors claimed that she had bewitched cattle. Charges of practicing witchcraft were brought before the Pennsylvania Provincial Council in February 1683 (under Julian calendar). This occurred nineteen years after the Swedish territory became a British common law colony and subject to English Witchcraft Act 1604.  Accused by several neighbors, as well as her own daughter in law, Mattson's alleged crimes included making threats against neighbors, causing cows to give little milk, bewitching and killing livestock and appearing to witnesses in spectral form. On February 27, 1683, charges against Mattson and a neighbor Gertro (a.k.a. Yeshro) Jacobsson, wife of Hendrick Jacobsson, were brought by the Attorney General before a grand jury of 21 men overseen by the colony's proprietor, William Penn. The grand jury returned a true bill indictment that afternoon, and the cases proceeded to trial. A petit jury of 12 men was selected by Penn and an interpreter was appointed for the Finnish women, who did not speak English. Penn barred the use of prosecution and defense lawyers, conducted the questioning himself, and permitted the introduction of unsubstantiated hearsay. Penn himself gave the closing charge and directions to the jury, but what he told them was not transcribed. According to the minutes of the Provincial Council, dated February 27, 1683, the jury returned with a verdict of "Guilty of having the Comon Fame of a Witch, but not Guilty in manner and Forme as Shee stands Endicted."

Thus Mattson was found guilty of having the reputation of a witch, but not guilty of bewitching animals. Neither woman was convicted of witchcraft. "Hence the superstitious got enough to have their thinking affirmed. Those less superstitious, and justice minded, got what they wanted." The accused were released on their husbands posting recognizance bonds of 50 pounds and promising six months' good behavior.

A popular legend tells of William Penn dismissing the charges against Mattson by affirming her legal right to fly on a broomstick over Philadelphia, saying "Well, I know of no law against it." The record fails to show any such commentary, but the story probably reflects popular views of Penn's socially progressive Quaker values.

Tennessee 
Accusations of witchcraft and wizardry led to the prosecution of a man in Tennessee as recently as 1833.

Latin America 

When Franciscan friars from New Spain arrived in the Americas in 1524, they introduced Diabolism—belief in the Christian concept of The Devil—to the Indigenous peoples of the Americas. Bartolomé de las Casas believed that human sacrifice was not diabolic, in fact far off from it, and was a natural result of religious expression. Mexican Indians gladly took in the belief of Diabolism and still managed to keep their belief in creator-destroyer deities.

Witchcraft was an important part of the social and cultural history of late-Colonial Mexico, during the Mexican Inquisition. Spanish Inquisitors viewed witchcraft as a problem that could be cured simply through confession. Yet, as anthropologist Ruth Behar writes, witchcraft, not only in Mexico but in Latin America in general, was a "conjecture of sexuality, witchcraft, and religion, in which Spanish, indigenous, and African cultures converged." Furthermore, witchcraft in Mexico generally required an interethnic and interclass network of witches. Yet, according to anthropology professor Laura Lewis, witchcraft in colonial Mexico ultimately represented an "affirmation of hegemony" for women, Indians, and especially Indian women over their white male counterparts as a result of the casta system.

The presence of the witch is a constant in the ethnographic history of colonial Brazil, especially during the several denunciations and confessions given to the Congregation for the Doctrine of the Faith of Bahia (1591–1593), Pernambuco and Paraíba (1593–1595).

Brujería, often called a Latin American form of witchcraft, is a syncretic Afro-Caribbean tradition that combines Indigenous religious and magical practices from Aruba, Bonaire, and Curaçao in the Dutch Caribbean, Catholicism, and European witchcraft. The tradition and terminology is considered to encompass both helpful and harmful practices.

Navajo 
The  is the type of witch known in English as a skin-walker. They are believed to take the forms of animals in order to travel in secret and do harm to the innocent. In the Navajo language,  translates to 'with it, he goes on all fours'.

Corpse powder or corpse poison (literally 'witchery' or 'harming') is a substance made from powdered corpses. The powder is used by witches to curse their victims.

Traditional Navajos usually hesitate to discuss things like witches and witchcraft with non-Navajos.

Asia

India 

Belief in the supernatural is strong in all parts of India, and lynchings for witchcraft are reported in the press from time to time. Around 750 people were killed as witches in Assam and West Bengal between 2003 and 2008. Officials in the state of Chhattisgarh reported in 2008 that at least 100 women are maltreated annually as suspected witches. A local activist stated that only a fraction of cases of abuse are reported. In Indian mythology, a common perception of a witch is a being with her feet pointed backwards.

Nepal 

Apart from other types of Violence against women in Nepal, the malpractice of abusing women in the name of witchcraft is also prominent. According to the statistics in 2013, there was a total of 69 reported cases of abuse to women due to accusation of performing witchcraft. The perpetrators of this malpractice are usually neighbors, so-called witch doctors and family members. The main causes of these malpractices are lack of education, lack of awareness and superstition. According to the statistics by INSEC, the age group of women who fall victims to the witchcraft violence in Nepal is 20–40.

Japan 

In Japanese folklore, the most common types of witch can be separated into two categories: those who employ snakes as familiars, and those who employ foxes. The fox witch is, by far, the most commonly seen witch figure in Japan. The  then strikes up a deal with the fox, typically promising food and daily care in return for the fox's magical services. The fox of Japanese folklore is a powerful trickster in and of itself, imbued with powers of shape changing, possession, and illusion. These creatures can be either nefarious; disguising themselves as women in order to trap men, or they can be benign forces as in the story of "The Grateful foxes". By far, the most commonly reported cases of fox witchcraft in modern Japan are enacted by  families, or 'hereditary witches'.

Philippines 

In the Philippines, as in many of these cultures, witches are viewed as those opposed to the sacred. In contrast, anthropologists writing about the healers in Indigenous Philippine folk religions either use the traditional terminology of these cultures, or broad anthropological terms like shaman.

Philippine witches are the users of black magic and related practices from the Philippines. They include a variety of different kinds of people with differing occupations and cultural connotations which depend on the ethnic group they are associated with. They are completely different from the Western notion of what a witch is, as each ethnic group has their own definition and practices attributed to witches. The curses and other magics of witches are often blocked, countered, cured, or lifted by Philippine shamans associated with the Indigenous Philippine folk religions.

During the 1580s in Manila, Philippines, the wife of the ex-governor (Guido de Labezaris) of the Philippines, Inés Álvarez de Gibraleón and their daughter Ana de Monterrey were put on trial for being accused of witchcraft and black magic. It resulted into two trials, however, due to there being no personal investigations, the ecclesiastical investigation was the result of hearsay. There is a record of this trial in the Archivo General de la Nación in Mexico City. However, the civil trial involving Ana de Monterrey and her husband Captain Juan de Morón disappeared.

Saudi Arabia 

Saudi Arabia continues to use the death penalty for sorcery and witchcraft. In 2006 Fawza Falih Muhammad Ali was condemned to death for practicing witchcraft. There is no legal definition of sorcery in Saudi, but in 2007 an Egyptian pharmacist working there was accused, convicted, and executed. Saudi authorities also pronounced the death penalty on a Lebanese television presenter, Ali Hussain Sibat, while he was performing the hajj (Islamic pilgrimage) in the country.

In 2009, the Saudi authorities set up the Anti-Witchcraft Unit of their Committee for the Promotion of Virtue and the Prevention of Vice police. In April 2009, a Saudi woman Amina Bint Abdulhalim Nassar was arrested and later sentenced to death for practicing witchcraft and sorcery. In December 2011, she was beheaded. A Saudi man has been beheaded on charges of sorcery and witchcraft in June 2012. A beheading for sorcery occurred in 2014.

Islamic State

In June 2015, Yahoo reported: "The Islamic State group has beheaded two women in Syria on accusations of 'sorcery', the first such executions of female civilians in Syria, the Syrian Observatory for Human Rights said Tuesday."

Europe 

Witchcraft in Europe between 500 and 1750 was believed to be a combination of sorcery and heresy. While sorcery attempts to produce negative supernatural effects through formulas and rituals, heresy is the Christian contribution to witchcraft in which an individual makes a pact with the Devil. In addition, heresy denies witches the recognition of important Christian values such as baptism, salvation, Christ and sacraments. The beginning of the witch accusations in Europe took place in the 14th and 15th centuries; however as the social disruptions of the 16th century took place, witchcraft trials intensified.

In Early Modern European tradition, witches were stereotypically, though not exclusively, women. European pagan belief in witchcraft was associated with the goddess Diana and dismissed as "diabolical fantasies" by medieval Christian authors. Throughout Europe, there were an estimated 110,000 witchcraft trials between 1450 and 1750 (with 1560 to 1660 being the peak of persecutions), with half of the cases seeing the accused being executed. Witch-hunts first appeared in large numbers in southern France and Switzerland during the 14th and 15th centuries. The peak years of witch-hunts in southwest Germany were from 1561 to 1670.

It was commonly believed that individuals with power and prestige were involved in acts of witchcraft and even cannibalism. Because Europe had a lot of power over individuals living in West Africa, Europeans in positions of power were often accused of taking part in these practices. Though it is not likely that these individuals were actually involved in these practices, they were most likely associated due to Europe's involvement in things like the slave trade, which negatively affected the lives of many individuals in the Atlantic World throughout the fifteenth through seventeenth centuries.

Early converts to Christianity looked to Christian clergy to work magic more effectively than the old methods under Roman paganism, and Christianity provided a methodology involving saints and relics, similar to the gods and amulets of the Pagan world. As Christianity became the dominant religion in Europe, its concern with magic lessened.

The Protestant Christian explanation for witchcraft, such as those typified in the confessions of the Pendle witches, commonly involves a diabolical pact or at least an appeal to the intervention of the spirits of evil. The witches or wizards engaged in such practices were alleged to reject Jesus and the sacraments; observe "the witches' sabbath" (performing infernal rites that often parodied the Mass or other sacraments of the Church); pay Divine honour to the Prince of Darkness; and, in return, receive from him preternatural powers. It was a folkloric belief that a Devil's Mark, like the brand on cattle, was placed upon a witch's skin by the devil to signify that this pact had been made.

Britain

Historians Keith Thomas and his student Alan Macfarlane study witchcraft by combining historical research with concepts drawn from anthropology. They argued that English witchcraft, like African witchcraft, was endemic rather than epidemic. Old women were the favorite targets because they were marginal, dependent members of the community and therefore more likely to arouse feelings of both hostility and guilt, and less likely to have defenders of importance inside the community. Witchcraft accusations were the village's reaction to the breakdown of its internal community, coupled with the emergence of a newer set of values that was generating psychic stress.

Wales

In Wales, fear of witchcraft mounted around the year 1500. There was a growing alarm of women's magic as a weapon aimed against the state and church. The Church made greater efforts to enforce the canon law of marriage, especially in Wales where tradition allowed a wider range of sexual partnerships. There was a political dimension as well, as accusations of witchcraft were levied against the enemies of Henry VII, who was exerting more and more control over Wales. In 1542, the first of many Witchcraft Acts was passed defining witchcraft as a crime punishable by death and the forfeiture of property.

The records of the Courts of Great Sessions for Wales, 1536–1736 show that Welsh custom was more important than English law. Custom provided a framework of responding to witches and witchcraft in such a way that interpersonal and communal harmony was maintained. Even when found guilty, execution did not occur.

Scotland and England

Becoming king in 1567, James VI and I brought to England and Scotland continental explanations of witchcraft. His goal was to divert suspicion away from male homosociality among the elite, and focus fear on female communities and large gatherings of women. He thought they threatened his political power so he laid the foundation for witchcraft and occultism policies, especially in Scotland. The point was that a widespread belief in the conspiracy of witches and a witches' Sabbath with the devil deprived women of political influence. Occult power was supposedly a womanly trait because women were weaker and more susceptible to the devil.

The last persons known to have been executed for witchcraft in England were the so-called Bideford witches in 1682.  The last person executed for witchcraft in Great Britain was Janet Horne, in Scotland in 1727. The Witchcraft Act 1735 abolished the penalty of execution for witchcraft, replacing it with imprisonment. This act was repealed by the Fraudulent Mediums Act 1951.

Current

Today in the United Kingdom children believed to be witches or seen as possessed by evil spirits can be subject to severe beatings, traumatic exorcism, and/or other abuse. There have even been child murders associated with witchcraft beliefs. The problem is particularly serious among immigrant or former immigrant communities of African origin but other communities, such as those of Asian origin are also involved. Step children and children seen as different for a wide range of reasons are particularly at risk of witchcraft accusations. Children may be beaten or have chilli rubbed into their eyes during exorcisms. This type of abuse is frequently hidden and can include torture. A 2006 recommendation to record abuse cases linked to witchcraft accusations centrally has not yet been implemented. Lack of awareness among social workers, teachers and other professionals dealing with at risk children hinders efforts to combat the problem.

There is a 'money making scam' involved. Pastors accuse a child of being a witch and later the family pays for exorcism. If a child at school says that his/her pastor called the child a witch that should become a child safeguarding issue.

Italy 

A particularly rich source of information about witchcraft in Italy before the outbreak of the Great Witch Hunts of the Renaissance are the sermons of Franciscan popular preacher, Bernardino of Siena (1380–1444), who saw the issue as one of the most pressing moral and social challenges of his day and thus preached many a sermon on the subject, inspiring many local governments to take actions against what he called "servants of the Devil". As in most European countries, women in Italy were more likely suspected of witchcraft than men. Women were considered dangerous due to their supposed sexual instability, such as when being aroused, and also due to the powers of their menstrual blood.

In the 16th century, Italy had a high portion of witchcraft trials involving love magic. The country had a large number of unmarried people due to men marrying later in their lives during this time. This left many women on a desperate quest for marriage leaving them vulnerable to the accusation of witchcraft whether they took part in it or not. Trial records from the Inquisition and secular courts discovered a link between prostitutes and supernatural practices. Professional prostitutes were considered experts in love and therefore knew how to make love potions and cast love related spells. Up until 1630, the majority of women accused of witchcraft were prostitutes. A courtesan was questioned about her use of magic due to her relationship with men of power in Italy and her wealth. The majority of women accused were also considered "outsiders" because they were poor, had different religious practices, spoke a different language, or simply from a different city/town/region. Cassandra from Ferrara, Italy, was still considered a foreigner because not native to Rome where she was residing. She was also not seen as a model citizen because her husband was in Venice.

From the 16th to 18th centuries, the Catholic Church enforced moral discipline throughout Italy. With the help of local tribunals, such as in Venice, the two institutions investigated a woman's religious behaviors when she was accused of witchcraft.

Spain 

Galicia in Spain is nicknamed the "Land of the Witches" due to its mythological origins surrounding its people, culture and its land. The Basque Country also suffered persecutions against witches, such as the case of the Witches of Zugarramurdi, six of which were burned in Logroño in 1610 or the witch hunt in the French Basque country in the previous year with the burning of eighty supposed witches at the stake. This is reflected in the studies of José Miguel de Barandiarán and Julio Caro Baroja. Euskal Herria retains numerous legends that account for an ancient mythology of witchcraft. The town of Zalla is nicknamed "Town of the Witches".

Oceania

Cook Islands 
In pre-Christian times, witchcraft was a common practice in the Cook Islands. All these prayers were metrical, and were handed down from generation to generation with the utmost care. There were prayers for every such phase in life; for success in battle; for a change in wind (to overwhelm an adversary at sea, or that an intended voyage be propitious); that his crops may grow; to curse a thief; or wish ill-luck and death to his foes. Few men of middle age were without a number of these prayers or charms. The succession of a sorcerer was from father to son, or from uncle to nephew. So too of sorceresses: it would be from mother to daughter, or from aunt to niece. Sorcerers and sorceresses were often slain by relatives of their supposed victims.

A singular enchantment was employed to kill off a husband of a pretty woman desired by someone else. The expanded flower of a Gardenia was stuck upright—a very difficult performance—in a cup (i.e., half a large coconut shell) of water. A prayer was then offered for the husband's speedy death, the sorcerer earnestly watching the flower. Should it fall the incantation was successful. But if the flower still remained upright, he will live. The sorcerer would in that case try his skill another day, with perhaps better success.

According to Beatrice Grimshaw, a journalist who visited the Cook Islands in 1907, the uncrowned Queen Makea was believed to have possessed the mystic power called mana, giving the possessor the power to slay at will. It also included other gifts, such as second sight to a certain extent, the power to bring good or evil luck, and the ability already mentioned to deal death at will.

Papua New Guinea 
A local newspaper informed that more than 50 people were killed in two Highlands provinces of Papua New Guinea in 2008 for allegedly practicing witchcraft. An estimated 50–150 alleged witches are killed each year in Papua New Guinea.

Slavic Russia 
Among the Russian words for witch,  literally means 'one who knows', from Old Slavic  'to know'.

Spells 
Pagan practices formed a part of Russian and Eastern Slavic culture; the Russian people were deeply superstitious. The witchcraft practiced consisted mostly of earth magic and herbology; it was not so significant which herbs were used in practices, but how these herbs were gathered. Ritual centered on harvest of the crops and the location of the sun was very important. One source, pagan author Judika Illes, tells that herbs picked on Midsummer's Eve were believed to be most powerful, especially if gathered on Bald Mountain near Kiev during the witches' annual revels celebration. Botanicals should be gathered, "During the seventeenth minute of the fourteenth hour, under a dark moon, in the thirteenth field, wearing a red dress, pick the twelfth flower on the right."

Spells also served for midwifery, shape-shifting, keeping lovers faithful, and bridal customs. Spells dealing with midwifery and childbirth focused on the spiritual wellbeing of the baby. Shape-shifting spells involved invocation of the wolf as a spirit animal. To keep men faithful, lovers would cut a ribbon the length of his erect penis and soak it in his seminal emissions after sex while he was sleeping, then tie seven knots in it; keeping this talisman of knot magic ensured loyalty. Part of an ancient pagan marriage tradition involved the bride taking a ritual bath at a bathhouse before the ceremony. Her sweat would be wiped from her body using raw fish, and the fish would be cooked and fed to the groom.

Demonism, or black magic, was not prevalent. Persecution for witchcraft, mostly involved the practice of simple earth magic, founded on herbology, by solitary practitioners with a Christian influence. In one case investigators found a locked box containing something bundled in a kerchief and three paper packets, wrapped and tied, containing crushed grasses. Most rituals of witchcraft were very simple—one spell of divination consists of sitting alone outside meditating, asking the earth to show one's fate.

While these customs were unique to Russian culture, they were not exclusive to this region. Russian pagan practices were often akin to paganism in other parts of the world. The Chinese concept of chi, a form of energy that often manipulated in witchcraft, is known as bioplasma in Russian practices. The western concept of an "evil eye" or a "hex" was translated to Russia as a "spoiler". A spoiler was rooted in envy, jealousy and malice. Spoilers could be made by gathering bone from a cemetery, a knot of the target's hair, burned wooden splinters and several herb Paris berries (which are very poisonous). Placing these items in sachet in the victim's pillow completes a spoiler. The Sumerians, Babylonians, Assyrians, and the ancient Egyptians recognized the evil eye from as early as 3,000 BCE; in Russian practices it is seen as a sixteenth-century concept.

Societal view of witchcraft 
The dominant societal concern about those practicing witchcraft was not whether it was effective, but whether it could cause harm. Peasants in Russian and Ukrainian societies often shunned witchcraft, unless they needed help against supernatural forces. Impotence, stomach pains, barrenness, hernias, abscesses, epileptic seizures, and convulsions were all attributed to evil (or witchcraft). This is reflected in linguistics; there are numerous words for a variety of practitioners of paganism-based healers.

Ironically enough, there was universal reliance on folk healers—but clients often turned them in if something went wrong. According to Russian historian Valerie A. Kivelson, witchcraft accusations were normally thrown at lower-class peasants, townspeople and Cossacks. People turned to witchcraft as a means to support themselves. The ratio of male to female accusations was 75% to 25%. Males were targeted more, because witchcraft was associated with societal deviation. Because single people with no settled home could not be taxed, males typically had more power than women in their dissent.

The history of Witchcraft had evolved around society. More of a psychological concept to the creation and usage of Witchcraft can create the assumption as to why women are more likely to follow the practices behind Witchcraft. Identifying with the soul of an individual's self is often deemed as "feminine" in society. There is analyzed social and economic evidence to associate between witchcraft and women.

Russian witch trials 

Witchcraft trials frequently occurred in seventeenth-century Russia, although the "great witch-hunt" is believed to be a predominantly Western European phenomenon. However, as the witchcraft-trial craze swept across Catholic and Protestant countries during this time, Orthodox Christian Europe indeed partook in this so-called "witch hysteria". This involved the persecution of both males and females who were believed to be practicing paganism, herbology, the black art, or a form of sorcery within and/or outside their community. Very early on witchcraft legally fell under the jurisdiction of the ecclesiastical body, the church, in Kievan Rus' and Muscovite Russia.

The cold-water test was primarily a Western European phenomenon, but it was also used as a method of truth in Russia both prior to, and post, seventeenth-century witchcraft trials in Muscovy. Accused persons who submerged were considered innocent, and ecclesiastical authorities would proclaim them "brought back", but those who floated were considered guilty of practicing witchcraft, and they were either burned at the stake or executed in an unholy fashion. The thirteenth-century bishop of Vladimir, Serapion Vladimirskii, preached sermons throughout the Muscovite countryside, and in one particular sermon revealed that burning was the usual punishment for witchcraft, but more often the cold water test was used as a precursor to execution.

Although these two methods of torture were used in the west and the east, Russia implemented a system of fines payable for the crime of witchcraft during the seventeenth century. Thus, even though torture methods in Muscovy were on a similar level of harshness as Western European methods used, a more civil method was present. In the introduction of a collection of trial records pieced together by Russian scholar Nikolai Novombergsk, he argues that Muscovite authorities used the same degree of cruelty and harshness as Western European Catholic and Protestant countries in persecuting witches. By the mid-sixteenth century the manifestations of paganism, including witchcraft, and the black arts—astrology, fortune telling, and divination—became a serious concern to the Muscovite church and state.

Tsar Ivan IV (reigned 1547–1584) took this matter to the ecclesiastical court and was immediately advised that individuals practicing these forms of witchcraft should be excommunicated and given the death penalty. Ivan IV, as a true believer in witchcraft, was deeply convinced that sorcery accounted for the death of his wife, Anastasiia in 1560, which completely devastated and depressed him, leaving him heartbroken. Stemming from this belief, Ivan IV became majorly concerned with the threat of witchcraft harming his family, and feared he was in danger. So, during the Oprichnina (1565–1572), Ivan IV succeeded in accusing and charging a good number of boyars with witchcraft whom he did not wish to remain as nobles. Rulers after Ivan IV, specifically during the Time of Troubles (1598–1613), increased the fear of witchcraft among themselves and entire royal families, which then led to further preoccupation with the fear of prominent Muscovite witchcraft circles.

After the Time of Troubles, seventeenth-century Muscovite rulers held frequent investigations of witchcraft within their households, laying the groundwork, along with previous tsarist reforms, for widespread witchcraft trials throughout the Muscovite state. Between 1622 and 1700 ninety-one people were brought to trial in Muscovite courts for witchcraft. Although Russia did partake in the witch craze that swept across Western Europe, the Muscovite state did not persecute nearly as many people for witchcraft, let alone execute a number of individuals anywhere close to the number executed in the west during the witch hysteria.

Contemporary witchcraft beliefs worldwide 

A 2022 study found that belief in witchcraft is still widespread in some parts of the world. It found that belief in witchcraft varied from 9% of people in some countries to 90% in others, and was linked to cultural and socioeconomic factors. Stronger belief in witchcraft correlated with poorer economic development, weak institutions, lower levels of education, lower life expectancy, lower life satisfaction, and high religiosity.

It contrasted two hypotheses about future changes in witchcraft belief:
 witchcraft beliefs should decline "in the process of development due to improved security and health, lower exposure to shocks, spread of education and scientific approach to explaining life events" according to standard modernization theory
 "some aspects of development, namely rising inequality, globalization, technological change, and migration, may instead revive witchcraft beliefs by disrupting established social order" according to literature largely inspired by observations from Sub-Saharan Africa.

Witches in art 

Witches have a long history of being depicted in art, although most of their earliest artistic depictions seem to originate in Early Modern Europe, particularly the Medieval and Renaissance periods.

, a ninth-century text that explored the subject of demonology, initially introduced concepts that would continuously be associated with witches, such as their ability to fly or their believed fornication and sexual relations with the devil. The text refers to two women, Diana the Huntress and Herodias, who both express the duality of female sorcerers. Diana was described as having a heavenly body and as the "protectress of childbirth and fertility" while Herodias symbolized "unbridled sensuality". They thus represent the mental powers and cunning sexuality that witches used as weapons to trick men into performing sinful acts which would result in their eternal punishment. These characteristics were distinguished as Medusa-like or Lamia-like traits when seen in any artwork (Medusa's mental trickery was associated with Diana the Huntress's psychic powers and Lamia was a rumored female figure in the Medieval ages sometimes used in place of Herodias).

One of the first individuals to regularly depict witches after the witch-craze of the medieval period was Albrecht Dürer, a German Renaissance artist. His famous 1497 engraving The Four Witches, portrays four physically attractive and seductive nude witches. Their supernatural identities are emphasized by the skulls and bones lying at their feet as well as the devil discreetly peering at them from their left. The women's sensuous presentation speaks to the overtly sexual nature they were attached to in early modern Europe. Moreover, this attractiveness was perceived as a danger to ordinary men who they could seduce and tempt into their sinful world.

Dürer also employed other ideas from the Middle Ages that were commonly associated with witches. Specifically, his art often referred to former 12th- to 13th-century Medieval iconography addressing the nature of female sorcerers. In the Medieval period, there was a widespread fear of witches, accordingly producing an association of dark, intimidating characteristics with witches, such as cannibalism (witches described as "[sucking] the blood of newborn infants") or described as having the ability to fly, usually on the back of black goats. As the Renaissance period began, these concepts of witchcraft were suppressed, leading to a drastic change in the sorceress' appearances, from sexually explicit beings to the 'ordinary' typical housewives of this time period. This depiction, known as the 'Waldensian' witch became a cultural phenomenon of early Renaissance art. The term originates from the 12th-century monk Peter Waldo, who established his own religious sect which explicitly opposed the luxury and commodity-influenced lifestyle of the Christian church clergy, and whose sect was excommunicated before being persecuted as "practitioners of witchcraft and magic".

Subsequent artwork exhibiting witches tended to consistently rely on cultural stereotypes about these women. These stereotypes were usually rooted in early Renaissance religious discourse, specifically the Christian belief that an "earthly alliance" had taken place between Satan's female minions who "conspired to destroy Christendom".

Another significant artist whose art consistently depicted witches was Dürer's apprentice, Hans Baldung Grien, a 15th-century German artist. His chiaroscuro woodcut, Witches, created in 1510, visually encompassed all the characteristics that were regularly assigned to witches during the Renaissance. Social beliefs labeled witches as supernatural beings capable of doing great harm, possessing the ability to fly, and as cannibalistic. The urn in Witches seems to contain pieces of the human body, which the witches are seen consuming as a source of energy. Meanwhile, their nudity while feasting is recognized as an allusion to their sexual appetite, and some scholars read the witch riding on the back of a goat-demon as representative of their "flight-inducing [powers]". This connection between women's sexual nature and sins was thematic in the pieces of many Renaissance artists, especially Christian artists, due to cultural beliefs which characterized women as overtly sexual beings who were less capable (in comparison to men) of resisting sinful temptation.

Witches in fiction 
Witches in fiction span a wide array of characterizations. They are typically, but not always, female, and generally depicted as either villains or heroines.

The classic fairy tale "Hansel and Gretel" presents an example of the "witch villain" figure. The story involves a cannibalistic witch that eventually becomes outwitted by the children she tries to eat and is burned to death in her own oven. "Snow White" depicts a murderous, tempting magician for its main antagonist. The witch is labeled an evil queen and meets her demise after being forced to dance in red-hot iron shoes. "The Six Swans" includes a step-mother who magically turns her step-children into swans out of spite and jealousy. In retaliation, the figure labeled as witch is eventually burned at the stake. Such examples within the Brothers Grimm's works demonstrate not only evidence of the figure of "witch villain" but also exhibits their punishment by injury or violent death. Other examples of villainous witches in literature include the White Witch from C. S. Lewis's The Lion, the Witch and the Wardrobe and the Grand High Witch from Roald Dahl's The Witches.

Living Alone, published in 1919, uses the "witch heroine" as an agent in support of female liberation. Stella Benson's novel surrounds the musings of a female witch who functions as an anarchic force in the lives of middle-class Londoners. Her non-harmful magic aims to "shake the most downtrodden women out of complacency and normality" to meet a state of liberation. The importance of such a heroine sheds light on the positive effects associated with magic and witchcraft, a change from the often brutalized and tortured illustrations found in early nineteenth century literature. Other examples of heroic witches in fictional literature include Glinda from The Wonderful Wizard of Oz (1900), Serafina Pekkala from His Dark Materials (1995–2000), and Hermione Granger from the Harry Potter series.

See also
 Witches Sabbath
 Feminist interpretations of the Early Modern witch trials
 Flying ointment
 Neoshamanism
 Kitchen witch

Footnotes

References

Referenced works 
 Alan Macfarlane, Witchcraft in Tudor and Stuart England, Psychology Press, 1999 (orig. 1970) 
 University of Kansas Publications in Anthropology, No. 5 = John M Janzen and Wyatt MacGaffey: An Anthology of Kongo Religion: Primary Texts from Lower Zaïre. Lawrence, 1974.
 Studia Instituti Anthropos, Vol. 41 = Anthony J. Gittins: Mende Religion. Steyler Verlag, Nettetal, 1987.

Further reading 
 
 Boyer, Paul and Stephen Nissenbaum, eds. The Salem Witchcraft Papers: Verbatim Transcripts of the Legal Documents of the Salem Witchcraft Outbreak of 1692, Volumes I and II. New York: Da Capo Press, 1977. 
 
 
 
 
 Gaskill, Malcolm. "Masculinity and Witchcraft in Seventeenth-century England." In Witchcraft and Masculinities in Early Modern Europe, edited by Alison Rowlands, 171–190. New York: Palgrave-Macmillan, 2009. 
 
 
 Goss, D. K. (2008). The Salem witch trials. Westport, CT: Greenwood Press. 
 Gouges, Linnea de ''Witch Hunts and State Building in Early Modern Europe Nisus Publications, 2017. 
 Hall, David, ed. Witch-hunting in Seventeenth-century New England: A Documentary History, 1638–1692. Boston: Northeastern University Press, 1991.
 Henderson, Lizanne, Witch-Hunting and Witch Belief in the Gàidhealtachd, Witchcraft and Belief in Early Modern Scotland Eds. Julian Goodare, Lauren Martin and Joyce Miller. Basingstoke: Palgrave MacMillan, 2007
 Hill, F. (2000). The Salem witch trials reader. Cambridge, MA: Da Capo Press. 
 Hyatt, Harry Middleton. Hoodoo, conjuration, witchcraft, rootwork: beliefs accepted by many Negroes and white persons, these being orally recorded among Blacks and whites. s.n., 1970. 
 Kent, Elizabeth. "Masculinity and Male Witches in Old and New England." History Workshop 60 (2005): 69–92.
 
 Levack, Brian P. ed. The Oxford Handbook of Witchcraft in Early Modern Europe and Colonial America (2013) excerpt and text search
 Moore, Henrietta L. and Todd Sanders 2001. Magical Interpretations, Material Realities: Modernity, Witchcraft and the Occult in Postcolonial Africa London: Routledge. 
 Notestein, Wallace. A history of witchcraft in England from 1558 to 1718. New York : Crowell, 1968 
 
 Pentikainen, Juha. "The Supernatural Experience." F. Jstor. 26 February 2007.
 
 Ruickbie, Leo (2004) Witchcraft out of the Shadows: A History, London, Robert Hale.
 Stark, Ryan J. "Demonic Eloquence", in Rhetoric, Science, and Magic in Seventeenth-Century England (Washington, DC: The Catholic University of America Press, 2009), 115–45.

External links 

 
 Kabbalah On Witchcraft – A Jewish view (Audio) chabad.org
 Jewish Encyclopedia: Witchcraft
 Witchcraft and Devil Lore in the Channel Islands, 1886, by John Linwood Pitts, from Project Gutenberg
 A Treatise of Witchcraft, 1616, by Alexander Roberts, from Project Gutenberg
 University of Edinburgh's Scottish witchcraft database
 'Witchcraft and Statecraft, A Materialist Analysis of the European Witch Persecutions'

 
Sociology of religion
Religious controversies
Left-Hand Path
Recurrent elements in fairy tales